Achim Leistner is an Australian optician of German origin. During his retirement, he was asked to join the Avogadro project to craft a silicon sphere with high smoothness, as automated machining does not match his precision.

In addition to precision instruments, Leistner uses his hands to feel for irregularities in the roundness of the sphere. The research team has called his extraordinary sense of touch "atomic feeling". As a result the sphere is the roundest man-made object ever manufactured in the world. If the sphere was scaled to the size of Earth, it would have a high point of only 2.4 metres above "sea level".

Leistner holds certificates in precision optics, geometrical optics, optical design drawing, and mathematics from Optic Carl Zeiss Jena Technical College. He has served as a member of the Australian Optical Society and on international conference working committees for SPIE and the Optical Society of America.

See also

 List of Australians
 List of physicists

References

Footnotes 

Year of birth missing (living people)
Place of birth missing (living people)
20th-century births
20th-century Australian physicists
21st-century Australian physicists
German emigrants to Australia
Living people
 
Opticians